Thorvald Eiriksson was the son of Erik the Red and brother of Leif Erikson. 
The only Medieval Period source material available regarding Thorvald Eiriksson are the two Vinland sagas; the Greenland Saga and the Saga of Erik the Red. Although differing in various detail, according to both sagas Thorvald was part of an expedition for the exploration of Vinland and became the first European to die in North America.

The Greenland Saga describes a voyage made by Bjarni Herjolfsson, and the subsequent voyages of Leif Eriksson, his brother Thorvald Eiriksson, his sister Freydís Eiríksdóttir, and the Icelandic merchant Thorfinn Karlsefni. The Saga describes hostilities with Skrælings, the Norse term for the native peoples they met in the lands visited south and west of Greenland which they called Vinland and Markland. The Saga of Erik the Red  tells the story as a single expedition led by Thorfinn Karlsefni. The voyage  of Thorvald Eriksson is told here as part of the Karlsefni expedition.

See also
 Vinland

References

Other sources
 Brown, Nancy Marie (2012)  Song of the Vikings: Snorri and the Making of Norse Myths (Palgrave Macmillan) 
 Haugen, Einar (2007) Voyages To Vinland - The First American Saga Newly Translated And Interpreted (Barzun Press)  
 Jones, Gwyn (1986) The Norse Atlantic Saga: Being the Norse Voyages of Discovery and Settlement to Iceland, Greenland, and North America (Oxford University Press)  
 Magnusson, Magnus (1973) The Vinland Sagas: The Norse Discovery of America (Penguin Group) 
 Short, William R. (2010) Icelanders in the Viking age: the people of the sagas (McFarland) 

Year of birth unknown
1006 deaths
10th-century Icelandic people
11th-century Icelandic people
Viking Age in Canada
Explorers of Canada
Vikings killed in battle
Icelandic explorers
Pre-Columbian trans-oceanic contact
10th-century explorers
11th-century explorers
11th-century Vikings
Norse settlements in Greenland